Jhamar may refer to :

 the former Jamar State, and a village, on Saurashtra, in Gujarat, western India
 the Jhamar caste

See also
 Jhumair (disambiguation)